Dalreavoch  is a small crofting hamlet in  Rogart in Sutherland, Scottish Highlands and is in the Scottish council area of Highland.

The River Brora which rises in Ben Armine, east of Loch Shin, passes Dalreavoch.

References

Populated places in Sutherland